"Heaven/Squall" is the fourteenth single by Japanese artist Masaharu Fukuyama. It was released on November 17, 1999. It debuted at the number two position on the Oricon Chart in its first week with sales of 123,480 copies. It reached the number-one spot on the chart in its fifth week.

Heaven was used as the drama Out! Tsumatachi no Hanzai's theme song.

Track listing
 Heaven
 Squall
 Heaven(original karaoke)
 Squall (original karaoke)

Oricon sales chart (Japan)

References

1999 singles
Masaharu Fukuyama songs
Oricon Weekly number-one singles
Japanese television drama theme songs